Rushen is a House of Keys constituency in the south of the Isle of Man which incorporates most of the parish of Rushen together with the village districts of Port Erin and Port St Mary.

Until 2016 the constituency covered the whole of the sheading of Rushen except for the parish of Malew and the town of Castletown, and elected three MHKs. (Malew was removed from the constituency in 1986.)

In 2016 the constituency boundaries were redrawn. This constituency lost the parish of Arbory and a small part of the parish of Rushen and now consists of most of the parish of Rushen, plus the village districts of Port Erin and Port St Mary. It now elects two MHKs.

MHKs & Elections
This information is incomplete.

External links
Constituency maps and general election results

Constituencies of the Isle of Man